Metanarsia junctivittella is a moth of the family Gelechiidae. It is found in southern and south-eastern Kazakhstan, Uzbekistan, Turkmenistan, Tajikistan, Afghanistan and Pakistan.

The length of the forewings is 6–9 mm. The forewings are dark yellow with a brown longitudinal line. The hindwings are light grey. Adults are on wing from the end of April to late June.

References

Moths described in 1885
Metanarsia